John Mansfield Brumby  (born 21 April 1953) is the current Chancellor of La Trobe University and former Victorian Labor Party politician who was Premier of Victoria from 2007 to 2010. He became leader of the Victorian Labor Party and premier after the resignation of Steve Bracks. He also served as the Minister for Veterans' Affairs and the Minister for Multicultural Affairs. He contested his first election as premier at the November 2010 Victorian state election. His government was defeated by the Liberal/National Coalition led by Ted Baillieu. Brumby resigned as Labor leader after the election, on 30 November, to be replaced by Daniel Andrews. Within weeks of this leadership change, Brumby left parliament, with a Broadmeadows by-election taking place on 19 February 2011.

Brumby currently is the national president of the Australia China Business Council (ACBC).

Early life
Born in Melbourne, Brumby was educated at Ivanhoe Grammar School and then later, Melbourne Grammar School. He graduated in commerce (BCom) at University of Melbourne, in 1974; and he completed a Diploma of Education (DipEd) at the State College of Victoria at Rusden, in 1975.

He was a teacher at Eaglehawk High School, in Bendigo, from 1976 to 1979. From 1979 to 1983 he was an employee of the Victorian Teachers Union. He was also active in the Labor Party.

Political career

Federal MP 
In 1983 Brumby was elected to the Australian House of Representatives for the seat of Bendigo, which he held until his defeat in 1990. A member of the Labor Unity faction, he was a strong supporter of Prime Minister Bob Hawke and an opponent of the Socialist Left faction, which historically had its stronghold in the Victorian branch of the Labor Party.

Brumby then worked as a consultant before being appointed chief of staff to the federal Minister for Resources and Tourism, Alan Griffiths with responsibility for the development of policy in areas such as energy, petroleum, minerals and tourism. He held this position until February 1993, when he was elected to the Victorian Legislative Council at a by-election for the seat of Doutta Galla Province in Melbourne's western suburbs.

State opposition leader 
The Victorian Labor government of Joan Kirner was defeated at the October 1992 state elections by the Liberal Party led by Jeff Kennett. Kirner resigned as leader after a short period and was succeeded by her deputy Jim Kennan. When Kennan resigned from parliament in June 1993, Brumby was elected his successor. He resigned from the Legislative Council and was elected to the Victorian Legislative Assembly at a by-election for Kennan's seat of Broadmeadows in Melbourne's outer north.

In 1996, Brumby opposed the Kennett state government's proposed relocation of the State Museum to the Carlton Gardens site adjacent to the Royal Exhibition Building. At this time, Brumby first proposed that the Royal Exhibition Building and Carlton Gardens be nominated for World Heritage listing. The World Heritage nomination was opposed at the time by the Kennett Liberal state government. It was not until after the 1999 state election that the Bracks Labor government nominated and obtained World Heritage Listing for the site.

From 1993 to 1996 Brumby worked to restore Labor's fortunes in Victoria. The defeat of the federal Labor government in March 1996 prompted Kennett to call an early state election three weeks later. Labour only managed a net two-seat gain, leaving it 20 seats behind the Coalition. This defeat was claimed to have undermined Brumby's position as leader. Brumby was later replaced as Labor leader in March 1999, agreeing to resign in favour of Shadow Treasurer Steve Bracks.

Bracks government

Steve Bracks narrowly won the state election called by Kennett in September 1999 and appointed Brumby as Minister for Finance, Assistant Treasurer and Minister for State and Regional Development. Brumby formed part of the core leadership team of senior ministers in the new government along with Bracks, Deputy Premier John Thwaites and Attorney-General Rob Hulls. Bracks initially served as treasurer and premier, assisted by Brumby who was responsible for Victoria's finances and most of the workload of the Treasury portfolio. On 22 May 2000, Brumby was appointed state treasurer.

As treasurer, Brumby presided over steady economic growth in Victoria, and his economic management was given some of the credit, along with the personal popularity of Bracks, for Labor's landslide re-elections in 2002 and 2006. Brumby ensured that the Labor Government maintained a budget surplus.

During 2004 Brumby was criticised by the state Liberal opposition for sharp increases in the rate of land tax in Victoria, which was criticised by many for potentially threatening the viability of many small businesses. Land tax rates were cut in the 2005 state budget. Faced with a choice of having to fund road infrastructure at the expense of the development of Victoria's schools, hospitals and public transport, Brumby decided to impose a toll on the new Scoresby Freeway (later known as EastLink) in eastern Melbourne. The decision, which broke a 2002 pre-election promise, provoked a hostile response from the Liberal Opposition and local community groups as well as caused the (Liberal) Federal Government to withhold its share of the funding for the project.

Premier of Victoria
On 27 July 2007 the then Victorian premier, Steve Bracks, announced his retirement from politics, citing family reasons for the decision. Deputy Premier John Thwaites also announced his resignation later that day. On 30 July Brumby was elected unopposed as leader, and was sworn in as premier later that day with Attorney-General Rob Hulls as his deputy.

Brumby even gained the endorsement of Jeff Kennett, the man he made an unsuccessful attempt to oust as Premier at the 1996 election. 

An early challenge occurred in November 2007 when State Labor MP Tammy Lobato publicly criticised Brumby over a decision by cabinet to allow genetically modified canola to be grown in Victoria. Other State Labor MPs were also said to be upset over Brumby's approach to the issue, and in particular, the way that he allegedly rail-roaded the policy through.

Brumby's response to a plan proposed by then Liberal Party Prime Minister John Howard for the federal government to assume control of the Murray-Darling Basin water catchment from the states was also an early issue. Under the previous Premier, Steve Bracks, Victoria had been the only state to refuse to accept Howard's plan. Following the election on 24 November 2007 of a new Australian Labor Party controlled federal government Brumby agreed to commit Victoria to an amended plan on 26 March 2008.

In April 2008 he was widely applauded for his move to break up the Victorian poker machine gambling duopoly starting in 2012. The move was supported in particular by organisations such as the Interchurch Gambling Taskforce and the Australian Hotels Association. Some concerns, however, were raised that the decision could ultimately result in a A$1 billion compensation claim from the companies standing to lose their duopoly status as a result of the decision, Tattersalls and Tabcorp. The government, however, denied that any claim for compensation would be successful.

In May 2008, following the reporting of several episodes of violence in various Melbourne Bars and Clubs in the media, Brumby announced a 2am entry curfew on Melbourne city bars, pubs and clubs. The move sparked considerable opposition, with venue operators launching successful legal contests to the legislation, and patrons protesting outside State Parliament House. Brumby announced the dropping of the plan in November 2008, following an increase in violence which the legislation had been aimed at curbing. Critics of the curfew system called the plan populist and regressive, with little concern for the impact on the vast majority of club-goers that did not instigate violence. Subsequently, liquor licensing changes impacted live music venues, notably with The Tote Hotel (amongst others) claiming they had been forced into closure as the operator could no longer afford to support the extra staff required under changes to legislation. Critics argued that these types of venues were not often problem areas for police, and that legislative changes were poorly planned and implemented.

During 2008 Brumby's government passed an act decriminalising abortion.

He contested as Premier at the November 2010 Victorian state election and his government was narrowly defeated by the Liberal/National Coalition led by Ted Baillieu.

On 30 November, Brumby announced that he was standing down as Labor leader in Victoria, and that the parliamentary Labor Party would meet on 3 December to elect a new leader and shadow ministry. Ted Baillieu was sworn in as Premier on 2 December formally ending Brumby's tenure, with Brumby resigning from parliament on 21 December.

Post-political career
Following his resignation from parliament, Brumby was appointed as a joint Vice Chancellor's Fellow at Monash University and the University of Melbourne, chairman of Motor Trades Association of Australia Superannuation Fund, member of the federal government's GST Distribution Review panel, and a director of Huawei in Australia. In 2017 he was appointed an Officer of the Order of Australia for distinguished service to the Parliament of Victoria, to economic management and medical biotechnology innovation, to improved rural and regional infrastructure, and to the community. He is currently the Australian China Business Council (ACBC) national president.

Personal life
John Brumby is married to Rosemary McKenzie and has three children. His father, Malcolm Brumby, died from a stroke on 26 September 2010.

See also

Brumby Ministry

References

External links

Victorian Labor: John Brumby

|-

|-

|-

|-

|-

|-

|-

 

Academic staff of the University of Melbourne
1953 births
Living people
Delegates to the Australian Constitutional Convention 1998
20th-century Australian politicians
Premiers of Victoria
Members of the Australian House of Representatives
Members of the Australian House of Representatives for Bendigo
Politicians from Melbourne
Members of the Victorian Legislative Council
Members of the Victorian Legislative Assembly
Victorian Ministers for the Environment
Deakin University alumni
University of Melbourne alumni
People educated at Melbourne Grammar School
Officers of the Order of Australia
Recipients of the Centenary Medal
Treasurers of Victoria
Leaders of the Opposition in Victoria (Australia)
Academic staff of Monash University
Australian schoolteachers
Australian trade unionists
Australian Labor Party members of the Parliament of Victoria
Australian Labor Party members of the Parliament of Australia
Labor Right politicians
21st-century Australian politicians